The 2015 Carlsbad Classic was a professional women's tennis tournament played on outdoor hard courts. It was the first edition of the tournament as part of the 2015 WTA 125K series. It took place in Carlsbad, California, United States, on 23–29 November 2015. First-seeded Yanina Wickmayer won the singles title.

Singles entrants

Seeds 

 1 Rankings as of 16 November 2015.

Other entrants 
The following players received wildcards into the singles main draw:
  Brett Berger
  Nicole Mossmer
  Zoë Gwen Scandalis
  Alexandra Stevenson
  Yanina Wickmayer

The following players received entry from the qualifying draw:
  Françoise Abanda
  Sharon Fichman

Doubles entrants

Seeds 

 1 Rankings as of 16 November 2015.

Other entrants 
The following pair received a wildcard into the doubles main draw:
  Kaitlyn Christian /  Sabrina Santamaria

Finals

Singles 

  Yanina Wickmayer defeated  Nicole Gibbs, 6–3, 7–6(7–4)

Doubles 

  Gabriela Cé /  Verónica Cepede Royg defeated  Oksana Kalashnikova /  Tatjana Maria, 1–6, 6–4, [10–8]

External links 
 Official website

2015 WTA 125K series
2015 in sports in California
2015 in American tennis
Southern California Open